My Dinner with Hervé is an American television drama film written and directed by Sacha Gervasi, based on the later days of actor Hervé Villechaize. The film stars Peter Dinklage as Villechaize, Jamie Dornan as a struggling journalist, and Andy García as Villechaize's Fantasy Island co-star Ricardo Montalbán. It premiered on HBO on October 20, 2018, and received generally positive reviews from critics, who praised the performances of Dinklage and Dornan.

Plot
Danny Tate, a journalist and recovering alcoholic, is sent to Los Angeles for work, which includes interviewing actor Hervé Villechaize. Feeling insulted after Tate ends their interview to leave for another one with Gore Vidal, Villechaize chides Tate about his career. Tate pays for their meal and leaves, but arrives late for his interview with Vidal, who promptly leaves.

Later that night, Tate receives a call from Villechaize, who insists on continuing their interview. Tate decides to do so, mainly in order to prevent himself from returning to drinking. Villechaize arrives in a limo and the pair drive through the city, while Villechaize details his past, from his parents learning of his dwarfism, his mother's resentment of him and his father's efforts to cure it, to his early career as a painter. After he is assaulted, his parents send him to New York City, where he is inspired to become an actor after spending two months in his apartment watching television. After securing representation from the William Morris Agency (by means of barging into Martin Rothstein's office with a knife), Villechaize is cast in the James Bond film The Man with the Golden Gun, earning applause from the audience as well as his mother upon its premiere. Despite the attention from The Man with the Golden Gun, Villechaize goes four years without work. He says that he kept praying and soon enough, Rothstein secures him a role in the series Fantasy Island, which renews Villechaize's popularity. Villechaize marries Camille Hagen after she guest stars on the show.

The pair go to a strip club, where Villechaize tries to coerce Tate into breaking his sobriety and get him a lap dance. Tate succumbs to temptation and has a beer, causing him to angrily storm out, intending to return to his hotel, but Villechaize convinces him to continue on with their late night odyssey, including a stop at Pink's Hot Dogs, where Villechaize takes over driving the limo and crashes it. Shortly after they continue driving, Tate presses Villechaize on his womanizing and his marriage to Hagen. This causes Villechaize to have the vehicle stopped and he storms off. Tate catches up to him, and begins to tell his side of the story when people started talking about him being a problem to work with, including accusing his co-star Ricardo Montalbán of having his lines taken out of scripts and hosting sexually charged parties onset. Tate accuses him of throwing his career away. Villechaize, while Tate reads off newspaper headlines of his exploits, tosses his file out the window before bringing them to Rothstein's house to have him confirm Montalbán was after him. Rothstein confirms this, but states Montalbán was not without reason, as Villechaize begins demanding more money and missing filming dates. He starts throwing money on reckless parties and gets into a fight with Billy Barty. His behaviour results in his firing from the show. Tate and Villechaize leave Rothstein's, and get into an argument. Tate storms off but Villechaize attacks him, holding a knife to his throat. Tate goads him to kill him, but Villechaize relents, prompting Tate to unload on Villechaize, blaming him for his own problems and that he's not the only one who's had a troubled life. Villechaize agrees to finally return Tate to his hotel, but first brings him to where they shot the pilot for Fantasy Island. Here Villechaize admits to Tate and himself he's the only one to blame for his troubles.

Hagen divorces him and has a restraining order leveled against him. Villechaize surmises he likely tried to force her to love him as opposed to it being real. While appearing as Tattoo at an event he has a breakdown and lights his costume on fire, breaking down in tears in the arms of his girlfriend Kathy Self.

Tate is returned to his hotel, and he agrees to meet with Villechaize later that night. Upon entering he finds a colleague there to replace him on the Vidal job. He calls his ex-wife Katie to apologize to her and accept that he can't fix things between them, and later that night goes to meet with Villechaize one last time before he returns to England. During this meeting, Villechaize admits that his mother was not among those praising him at The Man with the Golden Gun premiere, having walked out during the screening. Tate and Villechaize take a picture together and finally part ways on friendly terms.

As he is compiling his interview, Tate learns Villechaize had committed suicide shortly after he left. He presents his article to his editor, who orders him to cut it down. He elects to resign, and instead begins to write a book, titled My Dinner with Hervé.

Cast

 Peter Dinklage as Hervé Villechaize
 Jamie Dornan as Danny Tate
 Andy García as Ricardo Montalbán
 Mireille Enos as Kathy Self
 Oona Chaplin as Katie
 Harriet Walter as Baskin
 David Strathairn as Marty Rothstein
 Daniel Mays as Casey
 Alex Gaumond as André Villechaize
 Félicité Du Jeu as Evelyn Villechaize
 Wallace Langham as Aaron Spelling
 Mark Povinelli as Billy Barty
 Helena Mattsson as Britt Ekland
 Alan Ruck as Stu Chambers
 Michael Elwyn as Gore Vidal
 Ashleigh Brewer as Camille Hagen
 Mark Umbers as Roger Moore
 Robert Curtis Brown as Merv Griffin
 Sabina Franklyn as Katie's Mother

Production
Peter Dinklage and writer-director Sacha Gervasi spent several years writing and producing a film based on the final days of actor Hervé Villechaize, who committed suicide shortly after his 1993 interview with Gervasi. Dinklage stars in the title role in My Dinner with Hervé. In May 2017, the film was approved by HBO, with Dinklage being set to co-star alongside Jamie Dornan. In June 2017, Andy García was cast as Villechaize's Fantasy Island co-star Ricardo Montalbán. On June 23, Mireille Enos, Oona Chaplin and Harriet Walter joined the cast. On June 27, David Strathairn joined the cast. On July 28, Mark Povinelli and Helena Mattsson joined the cast.

Principal photography on the film began in June 2017.

Reception

Critical response
On Metacritic, the film has a weighted average score of 68 out of 100 based on 10 critics, indicating "generally favorable reviews". The site's critical consensus reads, "My Dinner with Hervé offers a standard narrative on celebrity and infamy, but formidable performances by Peter Dinklage and Jamie Dornan find the dimensionality and pathos of Hervé Villechaize the man."

Awards and nominations

References

External links
 

2018 biographical drama films
2018 films
2018 television films
American biographical drama films
Biographical films about actors
Biographical television films
Drama films based on actual events
American drama television films
Films about journalism
Films set in 1993
Films set in Los Angeles
HBO Films films
Works about dwarfism
2010s English-language films
Films directed by Sacha Gervasi
2010s American films